Steve Freund (born July 20, 1952, Sheepshead Bay, Brooklyn, New York City, New York, United States), is an American blues guitarist, singer, bandleader and record producer. Freund has toured throughout the United States (including stops in New York and Chicago). He is based in the San Francisco Bay Area, where he is best known.

Career
Freund came from a musical background; his mother played classical piano. He moved to Chicago in 1976. Freund appeared as a guest performer, along with Rusty Zinn, on R.J. Mischo's 1999 album, West Wind Blowin: Mountain Top Productions, Vol. 3.

Freund appeared at the San Francisco Blues Festival in 2005, the Chicago Blues Festival in 2007, and many other major festivals worldwide.

Discography
 Set Me Free – (1984)
 Romance without Finance – (1987)
 "C" For Chicago – (1999)
 I'll Be Your Mule – (2001)
 Is What It Is (with Dave Specter) – (2004)
 Lonesome Flight – (2010)
 Come On in This House – (2013)

References

External links
Official website

1952 births
Living people
American blues guitarists
American male guitarists
American blues singers
American bandleaders
Chicago blues musicians
Record producers from New York (state)
Jewish American musicians
20th-century American guitarists
20th-century American male musicians
21st-century American Jews